The Fighting Dinosaurs is a fossil specimen which was found in the Late Cretaceous Djadokhta Formation of Mongolia. It preserves a Protoceratops andrewsi and Velociraptor mongoliensis trapped in combat and provides direct evidence of predatory behavior in non-avian dinosaurs. The specimen was discovered in 1971 and has caused much debate as to how both animals came to be preserved together with relative completeness. Several hypotheses have been proposed, including a drowning scenario, burial by either dune collapse or sandstorm, or alternatively they were not buried simultaneously.

History of discovery

From 1963 to 1971, Polish-Mongolian paleontological expeditions were carried out in the Gobi Desert with the objective of fossil-finding. The expedition of 1971 visited several localities of the Djadokhta and Nemegt formations, discovering the lower beds of the latter. In that year on August 3, during the fieldwork of a team composed of paleontologists Tomasz Jerzykiewicz, Maciej Kuczyński, Teresa Maryańska, Edward Miranowski, Altangerel Perle and Wojciech Skarżyński, several fossils of Protoceratops and Velociraptor were found at the Tugriken Shire locality (Djadokhta Formation) including a block containing a pair of them. The individuals of this block were identified as a P. andrewsi struggling with a V. mongoliensis. Although the circumstances of their burial were unknown, their pose indicated that they died simultaneously in a death match.

The presence of the specimen on field was noted thanks to the overlapping skull fragments of the Protoceratops on the sediments, which eventually led to the excavation. It was soon nicknamed the Fighting Dinosaurs. The P. andrewsi individual is cataloged under the specimen number MPC-D 100/512 and the V. mongoliensis as MPC-D 100/25 (Mongolian Paleontological Center; originally GIN or GI SPS). In 2000 the American Museum of Natural History organized the traveling exhibit Fighting Dinosaurs: New Discoveries from Mongolia which was mainly focused on important Mongolian fossils with emphasis on the Fighting Dinosaurs, which is now regarded as a national treasure of Mongolia.

Interpretation

In 1974, Mongolian paleontologist Rinchen Barsbold suggested that the quicksand-like bottom of a lake could have kept them together or that both animals fell into a swamp-like waterbody, making the last moments of their fight underwater. In 1993, Polish paleontologist Halszka Osmólska proposed that during the death struggle a large dune may have collapsed, simultaneously burying both Protoceratops and Velociraptor. Alternatively, the Velociraptor may have been scavenging an already dead Protoceratops and then got buried and eventually killed by an unknown event.

In 1995, David M. Unwin and colleagues argued that scavenging was unlikely as there were numerous indications of a simultaneous death. The Protoceratops has a semi-erect stance and its skull is horizontally oriented, which would have not been possible if the animal was already dead. The Velociraptor has its right hand trapped within the jaws of the Protoceratops and the left one scratching the Protoceratops skull. As it lies on the floor with its feet directed to the prey's abdomen and throat areas, it is unlikely that the Velociraptor was scavenging. Unwin and colleagues also examined the sediments surrounding the specimen and concluded that the pair was buried alive by a sandstorm or sand-bearing event. They interpreted the final interaction with the Protoceratops being grasped and dispatched with kicks delivered by the low-lying Velociraptor. Finally, they suggested that populations of Velociraptor could have been aware of crouching behaviors in Protoceratops during high-energy sandstorms and used it for successful hunts.

In 1998, Kenneth Carpenter suggested another scenario in which the multiple wounds delivered by the Velociraptor on the Protoceratops throat had the latter animal bleeding to death. As a last effort, the Protoceratops bit the right hand of the predator and trapped it under its own weight, causing the death and eventual desiccation of the Velociraptor. The missing limbs of the Protoceratops were later torn off by scavengers. Finally, both animals were buried by sandy sediments. Given that the Velociraptor is relatively complete, Carpenter suggested that it may have been completely or partially buried by sand. He concluded that the Fighting Dinosaurs is among the specimens that provide direct evidence for non-avian theropods as active predators and not strict scavengers.

In 2016 Barsbold reported several anomalies within the Protoceratops individual: both coracoids have small bone fragments indicative of a breaking of the pectoral girdle, and the right forelimb and scapulocoracoid are torn off to the left and backwards, relative to its torso. He concluded that the prominent displacement of pectoral elements and right forelimb was caused by an external force that tried to tear them out. Barsbold suggested that scavengers were the most likely authors of these anomalies since the Protoceratops is missing other body elements and this event likely occurred after the death of both animals or during a point where movement was not possible. Because Protoceratops is considered to have lived in herds, another hypothesis is that members of a herd tried to pull out the already buried Protoceratops, causing the dislocation of its limbs. However, Barsbold pointed out that there no related traces to support this latter interpretation. Lastly, he restored the course of the fight with the Protoceratops powerslamming the Velociraptor, which used its raptorial sickle claws to damage the throat and belly regions and its hand claws to grasp the herbivore's head. Prior to their burial, the fight ended up on the ground with the Velociraptor lying on its back under the Protoceratops. After the burial event, either a Protoceratops herd or scavengers tore off the buried Protoceratops to the left and backwards, slightly separating the Protoceratops and the Velociraptor.

See also
 Dueling Dinosaurs
 Timeline of ceratopsian research
 Timeline of dromaeosaurid research

References

External links

 
 Reconstructed Fighting Dinosaurs at ArtStation
 3D model of the Fighting Dinosaurs specimen at Sketchfab

Dinosaur fossils